The 1941 Wyoming Cowboys football team represented the University of Wyoming in the Mountain States Conference (MSC) during the 1941 college football season.  In its first season under head coach Bunny Oakes, the team compiled a 2–7–1 record (1–5 against MSC opponents) and was outscored by a total of 233 to 44.

Schedule

References

Wyoming
Wyoming Cowboys football seasons
Wyoming Cowboys football